Shiri Burstein (born 5 December 1974) is an Israeli former professional tennis player.

Burstein represented Israel in a total of five Fed Cup ties across 1994 and 1995, mostly as a doubles player.

On the professional tour, Burstein reached a best singles ranking of 336, winning two ITF tournaments. She won a further six ITF titles in doubles, with a best ranking of 186 in the world.

ITF finals

Singles: 5 (2–3)

Doubles: 11 (6–5)

See also
List of Israel Fed Cup team representatives

References

External links
 
 
 

1974 births
Living people
Israeli female tennis players